Nikhil Sen (16 April 1931 – 25 February 2019) was a Bangladeshi dramatist. He was awarded Ekushey Padak in 2018 by the Government of Bangladesh.

Early life
Sen was born on 16 April 1931 at Kalash village of Barishal District to Jatish Chandra Sengupta and Shorojini Sengupta. After completing his secondary education, he went to Kolkata for higher education and was admitted to Kolkata City College. After his graduation, he came back to Barishal.

Career
Sen participated in cultural activities, especially theatre and recitation in Barisal since 1941. He was the founder member of the Barisal Shilpi Sangsad, formed in 1951. In 1953, he formed a theater troupe named Barisal Theatre. As of 2005, he had directed 28 stage plays including Manoj Mitra's Shajano Bagan, Momtazuddin Ahmed's Nildarpan and Mamunur Rashid's Ora Kadam Ali.

Awards and honors
 District Shilpakala Academy Reception (1996) 
 Bangladesh Group Theatre Federation Reception (1999)
 Martyr Muneir Chowdhury Award (2005)
 Shilpakala Padak (2015)
 Ekushey Padak (2018)

References

1931 births
2019 deaths
People from Barisal
Bangladeshi male writers
Bangladeshi dramatists and playwrights
20th-century Bangladeshi writers
Bangladeshi theatre directors
Recipients of the Ekushey Padak
Recipients of Bangla Academy Award